Sodium iodate (NaIO3) is the sodium salt of iodic acid.  Sodium iodate is an oxidizing agent.  It has few uses.

Preparation
It can be prepared by the reacting a sodium-containing base such as sodium hydroxide with iodic acid, for example:
HIO3 + NaOH → NaIO3 + H2O

It can also be prepared by adding iodine to a hot, concentrated solution of sodium hydroxide or sodium carbonate:
3 I2 + 6 NaOH → NaIO3 + 5 NaI + 3 H2O

Reactions
Sodium iodate can be oxidized to sodium periodate in water solutions by hypochlorites or other strong oxidizing agents:

Uses 
The main use of sodium iodate in everyday life is in iodised salt. The other compounds which are used in iodised table salt are  potassium iodate, potassium iodide, and sodium iodide. Sodium iodate comprises 15 to 50 mg per kilogram of applicable salt.

Sodium iodate is also used as a dough conditioner to strengthen the dough.

Safety
Iodates combined with organic compounds form an explosive mixture.

References

Iodates
Sodium compounds
Oxidizing agents